Robert Fellowes, Baron Fellowes,  (born 11 December 1941) is a British courtier who was Private Secretary to Queen Elizabeth II from 1990 to 1999, and is also known as a brother-in-law of Diana, Princess of Wales and maternal first cousin of Ronald Ferguson, the father of Sarah, Duchess of York.

Family background
Fellowes is the son of Scots Guards Major Sir William Fellowes, the Queen's land agent at Sandringham, and of his wife Jane Charlotte Ferguson, daughter of Brigadier-General Algernon Francis Holford Ferguson (great-grandfather of Sarah, Duchess of York). The Fellowes of Shotesham in Norfolk are an old country family, junior branch to the Lords De Ramsey (senior branch).

Fellowes married Lady Jane Spencer, elder sister of Diana, Princess of Wales, on 20 April 1978 at Westminster Abbey, when he was an assistant private secretary to the Queen. Diana (who married Charles, Prince of Wales in 1981) was a bridesmaid. Baron and Baroness Fellowes have three children:
Laura Jane Fellowes (born 19 July 1980), 
Alexander Robert Fellowes (born 23 March 1983)
Eleanor Ruth Fellowes (born 20 August 1985).

Early career
Fellowes played cricket for Norfolk in the 1959 Minor Counties Championship, making one appearance each against Buckinghamshire and the Nottinghamshire Second XI. Fellowes was educated at Eton College and joined the Scots Guards in 1960 on a short service commission. After completion of service in 1963 he entered the banking industry, working for Allen Harvey and Ross Ltd, discount brokers and bankers, 1964–77. He was a managing director from 1968.

Royal service
In 1977 Fellowes was recruited to join the Royal Household as Assistant Private Secretary. He spent the next 20 years in the Private Secretary's Office, becoming Deputy in 1986, and Private Secretary in 1990.

Fellowes left his position in February 1999 to return to private banking, his retirement having been announced implicitly on 1 June 1998 when his successor Robin Janvrin was named. He was created a life peer on 12 July 1999 taking the title Baron Fellowes, of Shotesham in the County of Norfolk in the Queen's Birthday Honours List. He sat as a crossbench peer until his retirement on 10 February 2022.

Lord Fellowes was introduced to the House of Lords and took his seat formally on 26 October 1999. According to reports from the House of Lords, Lord Fellowes remains technically a member of the Royal Household.

Honours and legacy
He was made a Privy Counsellor (PC) in 1990. He received the Queen Elizabeth II Version of the Royal Household Long and Faithful Service Medal in 1997 for 20 years of service to the Royal Family. 

He served as Secretary and Registrar of the Order of Merit from 2003 to 2022. He remained an Extra Equerry to the Queen until her death in 2022.

Fellowes is portrayed by actor Andrew Havill in seasons 5 and 6 of The Crown.

Arms

References

External links
 "My Secretary and I" James Whitaker article in The Spectator, 6 June 1998.

1941 births
People educated at Eton College
Scots Guards officers
Companions of the Queen's Service Order
Crossbench life peers 
Living people
Knights Grand Cross of the Order of the Bath
Knights Grand Cross of the Royal Victorian Order
Members of the Privy Council of the United Kingdom
Private Secretaries to the Sovereign
Deputy Private Secretaries to the Sovereign
Assistant Private Secretaries to the Sovereign
Robert
English cricketers
Norfolk cricketers
Life peers created by Elizabeth II